Pomme de Terre (French for "potato", literally "ground apple") may refer to:

Pomme de Terre, Minnesota, a ghost town, US
Pomme de Terre Lake, in Missouri, US
Pomme de Terre River (Minnesota), US
Pomme de Terre River (Missouri), US
Pomme de Terre Township, Grant County, Minnesota, US

See also
 Pomme (disambiguation)